Caroline Kuhlman and Stephanie Rehe defeated Viktoria Milvidskaia and Larisa Savchenko in the final, 6–3, 5–7, 6–4 to win the girls' doubles tennis title at the 1984 Wimbledon Championships.

Seeds

  Viktoria Milvidskaia /  Larisa Savchenko (final)
  Digna Ketelaar /  Simone Schilder (quarterfinals)
  Niege Dias /  Mercedes Paz (first round)
  Rene Mentz /  Kathleen Schuurmans (first round)

Draw

Draw

References

External links

Girls' Doubles
Wimbledon Championship by year – Girls' doubles